The 1967 West Virginia Mountaineers football team represented West Virginia University in the 1967 NCAA University Division football season. It was the Mountaineers' 75th overall season and they competed as a member of the Southern Conference. The team was led by head coach Jim Carlen, in his second year, and played their home games at Mountaineer Field in Morgantown, West Virginia. They finished the season with a record of 5–4–1 overall and 3–0–1 in the SoCon, winning the conference title.

Schedule

Reference:

References

West Virginia
West Virginia Mountaineers football seasons
Southern Conference football champion seasons
West Virginia Mountaineers football